Ode to Joy is a 2019 American romantic comedy film starring Martin Freeman and Morena Baccarin. The film premiered at the 2019 RiverRun International Film Festival in Winston-Salem, North Carolina and was released theatrically on August 9, 2019.

Plot
Charlie (Martin Freeman) is a Brooklyn-based librarian in his forties suffering from cataplexy, causing him to faint whenever he experiences strong emotions, especially joy. Upon meeting the charming and free-spirited Francesca (Morena Baccarin), Charlie falls in love but sets her up with his brother Cooper (Jake Lacy) instead because of his condition.

Cast
 Martin Freeman as Charlie, Cooper’s brother
 Morena Baccarin as Francesca, Sylvia’s niece
 Jake Lacy as Cooper, Charlie's brother
 Jane Curtin as Sylvia, Francesca’s aunt
 Melissa Rauch as Bethany
 Shannon Woodward as Liza
 Hayes MacArthur as Jordan
 Ellis Rubin as Victor

Production
The film is based on a true story by Chris Higgins originally aired on This American Life.

Reception

References

External links
 
 
 
 This American Life segment that inspired the film

2019 films
2019 romantic comedy films
American romantic comedy films
2010s English-language films
Films set in Brooklyn
2010s American films